was an American historian.

Biography
A nisei, Najita was raised in Hawaii. He graduated from Grinnell College in 1958, and was named a Woodrow Wilson Fellow. While in Grinnell, he became a member of Phi Beta Kappa. Najita completed a doctorate at Harvard University in 1965.

Upon finishing his studies, Najita began teaching at Carleton College. He left Carleton in 1966, and became an associate professor at the University of Wisconsin. In 1969, Najita joined the University of Chicago faculty, and was later named a Robert S. Ingersolll Distinguished Service Professor in History and East Asian Languages and Civilizations.

Over the course of his career, Najita received a Guggenheim Fellowship in 1981, and was named to the American Academy of Arts and Sciences in 1993. Grinnell College honored Najita with an alumni award in 1998.  Five years after his retirement from the institution, the University of Chicago inaugurated the Tetsuo Najita Distinguished Lecture series in 2007.

Najita died at his home in Kamuela, Hawaii, on 11 January 2021, after a long illness.

Bibliography 
 Hara Kei in the Politics of Compromise, 1905-1915 (Harvard University Press, 1967).
 Japan: the Intellectual Foundations of Modern Japanese Politics (Prentice-Hall, 1974).
 Visions of Virtue in Tokugawa Japan: the Kaitokudo Merchant Academy of Osaka (University of Chicago Press, 1987).
 Ordinary Economies in Japan: a Historical Perspective, 1750-1950 (University of California Press, 2009).
 Tokugawa Political Writings, (Cambridge University Press, 1998).
 Japanese Thought in the Tokugawa Period, 1600-1868: Methods and Metaphors, co-edited with Irwin Scheiner, (University of Chicago Press, 1978).
 Conflict in Modern Japanese History: the Neglected Tradition, co-edited with J. Victor Koschmann, (Princeton University Press, 1982).

References

1936 births
2021 deaths
20th-century American historians
21st-century American historians
American Japanologists
Historians of Japan
Grinnell College alumni
Harvard University alumni
Carleton College faculty
University of Wisconsin–Madison faculty
University of Chicago faculty
Fellows of the American Academy of Arts and Sciences
American writers of Japanese descent
Hawaii people of Japanese descent
20th-century American male writers
21st-century American male writers
Presidents of the Association for Asian Studies
American academics of Japanese descent
American male non-fiction writers